Filip Kinček (born 24 August 1991) is a Slovak football defender who currently plays for ŠKF Sereď, on loan from FC Nitra.

FC Nitra

He made his Corgoň Liga debut for FC Nitra against FC Spartak Trnava on 12 March 2011.

External links
 FC Nitra profile

References

1991 births
Living people
Slovak footballers
Association football defenders
FC Nitra players
Slovak Super Liga players